Robyn Elaine Lively Johnson (born February 7, 1972) is an American actress. She is known for her roles in the 1989 films Teen Witch and The Karate Kid Part III. She is also known for her roles in the TV shows Doogie Howser, M.D.; Twin Peaks; Savannah; and Saving Grace.

Early life
Robyn Lively was born into a family of actors in Powder Springs, Georgia; her mother, adoptive father, and all four siblings are or have been in the entertainment industry. She is the daughter of talent manager Elaine Lively (née McAlpin) and her first husband Ronald Otis (Ronnie) Lively. Her siblings are sister Lori and brother Jason, and her half-siblings are Eric and Blake.

Career
Lively began her career as a child actress: at age six, she made her screen debut in the television movie Summer of My German Soldier in 1978. Throughout the 1980s, she appeared in several television shows including Silver Spoons, Punky Brewster and Starman. She appeared in the feature films Wildcats, The Karate Kid Part III, Teen Witch, and Not Quite Human.

After she was cast as Jessica Andrews in The Karate Kid Part III in 1989, producers were forced to modify her role of protagonist Daniel LaRusso's new love interest because Lively was only 16 at the time of filming and still a minor while Ralph Macchio was 27 (although his character Daniel is 17). This situation caused romantic scenes between Jessica and Daniel to be rewritten so that the pair only developed a close friendship. In 2022, Lively reprised her role as Jessica Andrews in the fifth season of Cobra Kai, where it is revealed that Daniel is married to her cousin, Amanda.

At 19, Lively was nominated for an Emmy Award for her performance as an insecure teen in the 1991 ABC Afterschool Special episode "Less Than Perfect Daughter". In the 1990s she had recurring roles on Twin Peaks, Doogie Howser, M.D., and Chicago Hope. In 1996 she appeared as Lane McKenzie, one of three lead characters in the short-lived WB drama Savannah.

In 2003 Lively played NCIS Special Agent Vivian Blackadder in the JAG episodes "Ice Queen" and "Meltdown" (the backdoor pilot for NCIS).

In 2008 Lively appeared alongside Holly Hunter in an episode of Saving Grace and also had a role in Cold Case. In 2010 she appeared alongside Twin Peaks costars in the Dual Spires episode of Psych and starred in the TV series Gortimer Gibbon's Life On Normal Street for Amazon Studios as Gortimer Gibbon's mother, Claire.

In 2020, Lively starred in the thriller Through the Glass Darkly which premiered at the Frameline Film Festival on September 19, 2020.

Personal life

Lively married fellow actor Bart Johnson on September 25, 1999. The couple have three children: Baylen, Kate, and Wyatt Blake. The family resides in the Hollywood Hills.

Filmography

Award nominations

References

External links
 

Film Reference: Robyn Lively

1972 births
Living people
20th-century American actresses
21st-century American actresses
Actresses from Georgia (U.S. state)
American child actresses
American film actresses
American television actresses
People from Powder Springs, Georgia
Robyn